Ib Christensen (15 March 1930 – 3 January 2023) was a Danish politician. A member of the Justice Party of Denmark and the People's Movement against the EU, he served in the Folketing from 1973 to 1975 and again from 1977 to 1981. He was also a Member of the European Parliament from 1984 to 1994.

Christensen died in Randers on 3 January 2023, at the age of 92.

References

1930 births
2023 deaths
Members of the Folketing
Members of the European Parliament
MEPs for Denmark 1979–1984
MEPs for Denmark 1984–1989
MEPs for Denmark 1994–1999
People's Movement against the EU politicians
People from Randers Municipality